Seh Hezar Rural District is a rural district (dehestan) in Khorramabad District, Tonekabon County, Mazandaran Province, Iran. At the 2006 census, its population was 988, in 287 families. The rural district has 28 villages. One of these villages is Salaj Anbar.

References 

Rural Districts of Mazandaran Province
Tonekabon County